Coranzuli is a back-arc caldera in the Andes, related to the Altiplano-Puna volcanic complex.

It formed along the Lipez geological lineament about 6.6 million years ago. Volcanic ash samples found in the Coastal Cordillera of Chile may come from this volcano. The Rachaite stratovolcano is located close to the caldera. The formation of this caldera has been influenced by a number of local fault systems, the Coyaguayama and Rachaite lineaments.

Marine sediments of Ordovician age with some later volcanic intrusions form the basement together with Cretaceous-Eocene sediments. Three cycles of volcanic activity preceding the Coranzuli ignimbrite have been identified. The Coranzuli system is part of a Late Miocene volcanic episode that also includes Aguas Calientes, Cerro Panizos and the Toconquis ignimbrite of Galan.

The Morro Grande Formation may have originated by volcanic activity in the area of Cerro Coranzuli.  6.8 to 6.4 million years ago, this caldera erupted the Coranzuli ignimbrites. They are named in order from oldest to youngest Abra Grande ignimbrite, Potreros ignimbrite, Las Termas ignimbrites 1 and 2, and a smaller one Corral de Sangre. They are most likely the products of the same eruption. The Coranzuli Ignimbrite was erupted in three distinct flows, the last one is the largest one and has the highest matrix component. This ignimbrite is of rhyodacitic composition. The Las Termas Ignimbrite contains pumice and is highly welded and crystalline. The Cerro Coranzuli lava dome was erupted subsequently. A major seismic velocity anomaly is found beneath Coranzuli volcano.

References 

Volcanoes of Jujuy Province
Calderas of Argentina
Miocene calderas